The Stonehenge Free Festival was a British free festival from 1974 to 1984 held at the prehistoric monument Stonehenge in England during the month of June, and culminating with the summer solstice on or near 21 June. It emerged as the major  free festival in the calendar after the violent suppression of the Windsor Free Festival in August 1974, with Wally Hope providing the impetus for its founding, and was itself violently suppressed in 1985 in the Battle of the Beanfield, with no free festival held at Stonehenge since although people have been allowed to gather at the stones again for the solstice since 1999.

By the 1980s, the festival had grown to be a major event, attracting up to 30,000 people in 1984. The festival attendees were branded as hippies by the British press. This, along with the open drug use and sale, contributed to the increase in restrictions on access to Stonehenge, and fences were erected around the stones in 1977. The same year, police resurrected a moribund law against driving over grassland in order to levy fines against festival goers in motorised transport. By 1984 police-festival relations were relaxed with only a nominal police presence required.

Bands
The festival was a celebration of various alternative cultures. The Tibetan Ukrainian Mountain Troupe, The Tepee People, Circus Normal, the Peace Convoy, New Age Travellers and the Wallys were notable counterculture attendees.

The stage hosted many bands including Hawkwind, Gong,  Doctor and the Medics, Flux of Pink Indians, Buster Blood Vessel, Omega Tribe, Crass, The Damned, Killing Joke, The Selecter, Dexys Midnight Runners, Thompson Twins, Bronz, The Raincoats, The 101ers with Joe Strummer, Jeremy Spencer & the Children of God, Brent Black Music Co-op, Killerhertz, Mournblade, Amazulu, Wishbone Ash, Man, Benjamin Zephaniah, Inner City Unit, Here and Now, Cardiacs, The Enid, Roy Harper, Jimmy Page, Ted Chippington, Zorch, Ozric Tentacles and Vince Pie and the Crumbs, who all played for free.

The 1981 list of bands included Red Ice, Selecter, Theatre of Hate, Sugar Minott, Doll by Doll, Thompson Twins, Night Doctor, Merger, Androids of Mu, Deaf Aids, Killerhertz, The Raincoats, Thandoy, Foxes and Rats, ICU Lightning Raiders, Psycho Hampster, Misty in Roots, Andy Allen's Future, Inner Visions, Red Beat, Man to Man Triumphant, Stolen Pets, Seeds of Creation, Sorcerer, Coxone Sound System, Black Widow, Here and Now, Hawkwind, Steel and Skin, The Lines, Waiting for Arnold, Play Dead, Cauldron, Lighting by Shoe, Flux of Pink Indians, The Mob, Treatment, Popular History of Signs, The Wystic Mankers, Elsie Steer and Cosmic Dave.

See also
List of historic rock festivals
List of jam band music festivals
Phil Russell, aka Wally Hope, co-founder of the Stonehenge and Windsor free festivals.
Council of British Druid Orders

Bibliography 
McKay, George (1996) Senseless Acts of Beauty: Cultures of Resistance since the Sixties: chapter one "The free festivals and fairs of Albion", chapter two "O life unlike to ours! Go for it! New Age travellers". London: Verso Books. .

References

External links 

 Stonehenge free festivals 1972-85 - An illustrated History
 Tash's Stonehenge Festival and "Exclusion Zone" photo galleries
 BBC 2004 Stonehenge "Festival History" article
 "Stonehenge Campaign"
 Stonehenge: Celebration and Subversion by Andy Worthington (Alternative Albion, 2004)

Stonehenge
Music festivals in Wiltshire
Counterculture
Free festivals
Counterculture festivals
1972 establishments in England
1984 disestablishments in England
Music festivals established in 1972
Recurring events disestablished in 1984
Music festivals established in 1974
Rock festivals in the United Kingdom
Pop music festivals in the United Kingdom